Bernard Harrison may refer to:

 Bernard Harrison (cricketer) (1934–2006), English sportsman who played first-class cricket
 Bernard Harrison (zoologist) (born 1951), Singaporean zoologist